Kamin may refer to:

Places and general
Kamin in Westpreußen, German name of Kamień Krajeński, a town in Poland
Kamin Rural District, Iran
Kamin-2, an Iranian missile system
Operation Kamin, an offensive launched by Taliban insurgents in Afghanistan in May 2007

People

Surname
Aaron Kamin (active 1996-2005), American musician
Abbie Kamin (active from 2020), American politician in Houston, Texas
Baruch Kamin (1914-1988), Israeli politician
Ben Kamin (1953-2021), American rabbi, teacher, counselor and author
Blair Kamin, architecture critic of the Chicago Tribune 1992-2021
C. Richard Kamin (born 1944), American politician in New Jersey 
Franz Kamin (1941-2010), American author, composer, poet, performance-installation artist, and pianist
Leon Kamin (1927-2017), American psychologist
Mohammed Kamin (born 1978), citizen of Afghanistan who was held in the United States Guantanamo Bay detention camps
Morgan Kamin (born 1994), French footballer
Nikh Kamin (born 1967), Indian politician from Arunachal Pradesh
Philip Kamin (born ), Canadian music photographer
Shoshana Kamin (born 1930), Soviet-born Israeli mathematician

Given name
Brooke Kamin Rapaport (active from 1989), American curator
Kamin Kamani (active from 2004), Thai writer
Kamin Mohammadi (born 1969), exiled Iranian writer living in Britain
Jean-Luc Picard, called Kamin in The Inner Light

See also
Kamen (disambiguation)
Kamin Geran, a village in Iran
Kamin-Kashyrskyi, a town in Ukraine
Kamin-Kashyrskyi Raion, a district in Ukraine